Gisborne Central is the central business district and central suburb of Gisborne, in the Gisborne District of New Zealand's North Island. It is located east of Elgin, south of Whataupoko and west of Kaiti.

Demographics

Gisborne Central had a population of 300 at the 2018 New Zealand census, a decrease of 6 people (−2.0%) since the 2013 census, and an increase of 33 people (12.4%) since the 2006 census. There were 153 households, comprising 156 males and 144 females, giving a sex ratio of 1.08 males per female. The median age was 44.3 years (compared with 37.4 years nationally), with 30 people (10.0%) aged under 15 years, 66 (22.0%) aged 15 to 29, 156 (52.0%) aged 30 to 64, and 54 (18.0%) aged 65 or older.

Ethnicities were 58.0% European/Pākehā, 42.0% Māori, 4.0% Pacific peoples, 10.0% Asian, and 1.0% other ethnicities. People may identify with more than one ethnicity.

The percentage of people born overseas was 24.0, compared with 27.1% nationally.

Although some people chose not to answer the census's question about religious affiliation, 40.0% had no religion, 45.0% were Christian, 2.0% had Māori religious beliefs, 1.0% were Hindu, 1.0% were Buddhist and 4.0% had other religions.

Of those at least 15 years old, 42 (15.6%) people had a bachelor's or higher degree, and 42 (15.6%) people had no formal qualifications. The median income was $29,600, compared with $31,800 nationally. 45 people (16.7%) earned over $70,000 compared to 17.2% nationally. The employment status of those at least 15 was that 150 (55.6%) people were employed full-time, 39 (14.4%) were part-time, and 12 (4.4%) were unemployed.

Parks

Gisborne Botanical Gardens is a public garden, established in 1874.

Alfred Cox Park is a local park and dog walking area.

Childers Road Reserve

Childers Road Reserve is a sports ground.

It was previously the home of Gisborne City AFC and has hosted several national team and professional club football games, including:

 Gisborne City vs Bournemouth 0-4, 1982
 New Zealand vs League of Ireland All Stars 0-0, 1982
 New Zealand vs Gisborne City 4-3, 1985
 New Zealand vs Fiji 3-0, 1985
 New Zealand vs USSR XI 2-4, 1986
 New Zealand vs Dinamo Minsk 0-2, 1987

Education

Rolls are as of

References

Suburbs of Gisborne, New Zealand
Central business districts in New Zealand